Medioolithus is an oogenus of fossil egg laid by a paleognath.

Description
Medioolithus is known several eggshell fragments, and one complete, spherical egg. M. geiseltalensis is very similar to modern ratite eggs, for example those of ostriches, rheas, and cassowaries. At  in diameter, however, it is smaller than the eggs of any of these birds, being more similar in size to the egg of a kiwi.

References

Egg fossils
Fossil parataxa described in 1996